Evan Rachel Wood (born September 7, 1987) is an American actress, singer, and activist. She is the recipient of a Critics' Choice Television Award as well as three Primetime Emmy Award nominations and three Golden Globe Award nominations for her work in film and television.

She began acting in the 1990s, appearing in several television series, including American Gothic (1995–96) and Once and Again (1999–2002). She made her debut as a leading film actress at the age of nine in Digging to China (1997) and garnered acclaim for her Golden Globe-nominated role as the troubled teenager Tracy Freeland in the teen drama film Thirteen (2003). She continued acting mostly in independent films, including Pretty Persuasion (2005), Down in the Valley (2005), Running with Scissors (2006), and Across the Universe (2007).

Since 2008, Wood has appeared in more mainstream films, including The Wrestler (2008), Whatever Works (2009), and The Ides of March (2011). She returned to television the following year in the recurring role of Sophie-Anne Leclerq, the vampire Queen of Louisiana, on True Blood from 2009 to 2011. She also portrayed the title character's malicious daughter in the HBO miniseries Mildred Pierce (2011), for which she was nominated for the Golden Globe and Emmy Award for Best Supporting Actress. She starred as sentient android Dolores Abernathy in the HBO series Westworld (2016–2022), for which she won a Critics' Choice Award and earned Golden Globe and Emmy Award nominations. She also voiced Queen Iduna in the Disney animated fantasy film Frozen II (2019).

Early life and family
Wood was born in Raleigh, North Carolina. Her mother, Sara Lynn Moore, is an actress, director, and acting coach who converted to Judaism and raised her daughter in the Jewish faith. Her father, Ira David Wood III, is an actor, theater director and playwright prominent in Raleigh, where he is the co-founder and executive director of a community theatre company called Theatre in the Park. Wood's brother, Ira David Wood IV, is also an actor; she has two other brothers, Dana and Thomas, and a sister named Aden. Her paternal aunt, Carol Winstead Wood, was a production designer in Hollywood.

Wood was actively involved in Theatre in the Park while growing up, including an appearance in the 1987 production of her father's musical comedy adaptation of A Christmas Carol when she was just a few months old. She subsequently played the Ghost of Christmas Past in several productions there, and starred as Helen Keller alongside her mother (as Anne Sullivan) in The Miracle Worker, under her father's direction.

She attended Cary Elementary School in Cary, North Carolina, where she starred in its production of The Little Mermaid. When her parents divorced, she moved with her mother to her mother's native Los Angeles in 1997 to further her acting career. She attended public school in California before leaving at age 12 for homeschooling. She received her high school diploma at 15. Wood said she earned a black belt in taekwondo when she was 12, and that she participated in the AAU Junior Olympic Games.

Career

1994–2000: Early work
Wood began her career appearing in several made-for-television films that were shot in her native North Carolina from 1994 onwards. She also had recurring roles in the television series American Gothic (1995–1996) and Profiler (1998–1999), receiving a nomination for Best Supporting Young Actress in a TV Drama Series at the 21st Young Artist Awards for the latter.

Wood's first major screen role was in the low-budget 1997 film Digging to China, as a ten-year-old girl who forms an unlikely friendship with a mentally handicapped man, played by Kevin Bacon. It was shot in Western North Carolina and won the Children's Jury Award at the Chicago International Children's Film Festival. Wood remembers the role as initially hard, but that it "eventually led to her decision that acting is something she might never want to stop doing." The following year she had a role in Practical Magic, a fantasy film directed by Griffin Dunne starring Sandra Bullock and Nicole Kidman, for which she was nominated for Best Supporting Young Actress at the 20th Young Artist Awards. It was followed by the 1999 made-for-television thriller Down Will Come Baby, for which she was nominated for the YoungStar Award for Best Young Actress in a Mini-Series/Made for TV Film.

From 1999 to 2002, Wood was a regular on the ABC television family drama Once and Again in the role of Jessie Sammler. Her character dealt with her parents' divorce, anorexia, and falling in love with her best friend Katie, played by Mischa Barton, in what became the first teen lesbian pairing on network television. For her performance as Jessie, Wood was nominated for the YoungStar Award for Best Young Actress, and won Best Ensemble in a TV Series along with her co-stars Julia Whelan and Meredith Deane, at the 22nd Young Artist Awards.

2001–2005: Breakthrough
Wood made her teenage debut as a leading film actress in 2001's Little Secrets, directed by Blair Treu, where she played 14-year-old aspiring concert violinist Emily Lindstrom. For that role, she was nominated for Best Leading Young Actress at the 24th Young Artist Awards. Wood next played a supporting role in Andrew Niccol's 2002 satirical science fiction film Simone, which starred Al Pacino. That same year, Wood was recognized as One to Watch at the Young Hollywood Awards.

Wood's breakout movie role followed with Catherine Hardwicke's 2003 film Thirteen. She starred as Tracy Louise Freeland, a young teen who sinks into a downward spiral of hard drugs, sex, and petty crime. Her performance garnered critical acclaim, earning her Golden Globe and Screen Actors Guild nominations for Best Lead Actress. During the time of Thirteens release, Wood was featured on the cover of Vogue, with the magazine naming her as one of the "It Girls" of Hollywood. She similarly appeared, along with eight other teen actresses, on the cover of Vanity Fairs Young Hollywood issue in July 2003. A supporting role opposite Cate Blanchett and Tommy Lee Jones in Ron Howard's The Missing, in which she played the kidnapped daughter Lilly Gilkeson, followed the same year, earning her a nomination for Best Leading Young Actress at the 25th Young Artist Awards.

In 2005, Wood appeared opposite Kevin Costner and Joan Allen in the Mike Binder-directed The Upside of Anger, a well-reviewed film in which Wood played Lavender "Popeye" Wolfmeyer, one of four sisters dealing with their father's absence. Her character also narrated the film. Wood's next two starring roles were in dark independent films. In the 2005 Sundance Film Festival Grand Jury Prize nominee Pretty Persuasion, a black comedy focusing on the themes of sexual harassment in schools and attitudes about women in media and society, Wood played Kimberly Joyce, a manipulative, sexually active high-schooler. One critic commented, "Wood does flip cynicism with such precise, easy rhythms and with such obvious pleasure in naughtiness that she's impossible to hate." David Jacobson's neo-western Down in the Valley premiered later that year, in which Wood's character, Tobe, falls in love with an older man, played by Edward Norton, a cowboy who is at odds with modern society. Of her performance, it was written that "Wood conveys every bit of the adamant certainty and aching vulnerability inherent in late adolescence." Wood has commented on her sexually-themed roles, saying that she is not aiming for the "shock factor" in her film choices. Also in 2005, Wood starred in the music videos for Bright Eyes' "At the Bottom of Everything" and Green Day's "Wake Me Up When September Ends".

2006–2008: Continued success

By 2006, Wood was described by The Guardian as being "one of the best actresses of her generation." Later that year, she received the Spotlight Award for Emerging Talent at Premiere magazine's annual Women in Hollywood gala. Also in 2006, Wood appeared with an all-star ensemble cast as Natalie Finch in the comedy-drama film Running with Scissors. Directed by Ryan Murphy and starring Annette Bening, the film was based on the memoir by Augusten Burroughs, which is a semi-autobiographical account of Burroughs' childhood in a dysfunctional family.

Wood had roles in two films released in September 2007. King of California, which premiered at the Sundance Film Festival, tells the story of a bipolar jazz musician (Michael Douglas) and his long-suffering teenage daughter, Miranda (Wood), who are reunited after his two-year stay in a mental institution and who embark on a quixotic search for Spanish treasure. One review praised Wood's performance as "excellent." The second film was Across the Universe, Julie Taymor's jukebox musical set to the songs of the Beatles that was nominated for the Golden Globe Award for Best Musical or Comedy. Set during the counter-cultural revolution of the 1960s, Wood played Lucy, an American teen who develops a relationship with her brother's British friend Jude (Jim Sturgess). The film featured her singing musical numbers, and she has described the role as her favorite. One critic wrote that "Wood brings much-needed emotional depth."

Wood provided the voice of an alien named Mala in Battle for Terra, a 2007 computer-animated science fiction film about a peaceful alien planet that faces destruction from colonization by the displaced remainder of the human race. The film won the 2008 Grand Prize at the Ottawa International Animation Festival. The film was also screened at the San Francisco International Film Festival, where she received an award at the Midnight Awards. In 2007, Wood also starred in the Vadim Perelman-directed The Life Before Her Eyes, based on the Laura Kasischke novel of the same name, about the friendship of two teens of opposite character who are involved in a Columbine-like shooting incident at their school and are forced to make an impossible choice. Wood played the younger version of Uma Thurman's character, Diana. One critic cited her performance as "hands-down extraordinary." Wood stated that she intended the film to be the last one in which she played a teenager.

The following year, she co-starred in Darren Aronofsky's The Wrestler, winner of the Golden Lion Award for Best Film at the Venice Film Festival, about Randy "Ram" Robinson (Mickey Rourke), a professional wrestler from the 1980s who is forced to retire after a heart attack threatens to kill him the next time he wrestles. Wood played Stephanie, Robinson's estranged daughter. Of her performance, one critic wrote, "Once her character stops stonewalling her father and hears him out, Wood provides a fine foil for Rourke in their turbulent scenes together."

2009–present: Further film and television career

Wood co-starred in Woody Allen's Whatever Works, which premiered at the 2009 Tribeca Film Festival, playing the young wife of Larry David's character. She later expressed regret for taking the role and that she would not work with Allen again. In May 2009, she played Juliet in six fundraising performances of William Shakespeare's Romeo and Juliet at the Theater In The Park; the production was directed by her brother Ira, who also starred. That same year, Wood was named Young Hollywood Superstar at the Young Hollywood Awards.

Wood had a recurring role in the second and third seasons of the HBO supernatural drama series, True Blood, from 2009 to 2011 as Sophie-Anne Leclerq. Wood had a role in the film The Conspirator, which premiered at Ford's Theatre in Washington, D.C. in April 2011, directed by Robert Redford (about the conspiracy surrounding the assassination of Abraham Lincoln). She also had a role in The Ides of March. She portrayed the title character's daughter in the 2011 HBO miniseries Mildred Pierce, for which she was nominated for the Golden Globe Award and the Primetime Emmy Award for Best Supporting Actress.

In late 2012 she began filming 10 Things I Hate About Life, a followup to the hit 1999 teen comedy 10 Things I Hate About You in which she and Thomas McDonell played a couple who meet while attempting suicide. Filming was suspended when she became pregnant with her son; when it resumed again in 2013 Wood left the production, claiming she had not been paid beyond her $300,000 advance since the production company had not been able to raise enough money to pay her for the filming already completed. In response they sued her for $30 million; as of 2021 the suit has not been resolved but the film can no longer be finished.

Wood starred with Chris Evans in a 2010 ad campaign filmed by Frank Miller for Gucci Guilty Eau fragrances. Both actors reprised their roles for additional ads in 2013 and 2016. Wood played Gabi in the 2013 psychological romantic thriller film Charlie Countryman with Shia LaBeouf and Rupert Grint. She voiced Marianne in the 2015 film Strange Magic.

In 2016, Wood began starring as sentient android Dolores Abernathy in the HBO science fiction Western series Westworld. Her performance was praised as "spectacular", "tour-de-force, turn-on-a-dime", as well as "a tremendous technical achievement".

In August 2019, Wood announced on Twitter and D23 Expo that she was cast to voice Queen Iduna in Frozen II. The film was released in November 2019 to commercial success.

Other ventures

Music
In 2012, Wood recorded "I'd Have You Anytime" which is on the fourth CD of Chimes of Freedom: The Songs of Bob Dylan Honoring 50 Years of Amnesty International, a compilation production for the benefit of the organization. She performed as electro-pop duo, Rebel and a Basketcase, with multi-instrumentalist Zach Villa in 2016. The duo disbanded in August 2017. Wood is one-half of cover band Evan + Zane, which she formed with guitarist/singer-songwriter Zane Carney in 2018. Evan + Zane put out their first CD, called "Dreams," in December 2022.

Wood appeared on the Billboard Hot 100 for the first time in 2019 when "Show Yourself", the duet she sang alongside Idina Menzel from the Frozen II soundtrack, debuted on the chart at number 99. The song peaked at number 70.

Activism
In June 2016, the Human Rights Campaign released a video in tribute to the victims of the Orlando nightclub shooting; in the video, Wood and others told the stories of the people killed there.

In February 2018, she testified before the United States House Judiciary Subcommittee on Crime, Terrorism, Homeland Security and Investigations in support of the Sexual Assault Survivors' Bill of Rights Act. In April 2019, she testified before the California State Senate to help pass the Phoenix Act, which extended the statute of limitations in domestic-violence cases from three to five years and requires police to have additional training. In her testimony, Wood said the abuse she experienced by singer Marilyn Manson had been physical, sexual and emotional, including antisemitism, and that she had subsequently been diagnosed with complex post-traumatic stress disorder.

Personal life
Wood has said, "My mother is Jewish and I was raised with the religion." In 2012, she stated, "I believe in God but I am not religious. I am spiritual. My definition of God isn't in any religion. It's very personal."

Wood dated English actor Jamie Bell between 2005 and 2006. In January 2007, her relationship with Marilyn Manson became public; Wood was the inspiration for Manson's song "Heart-Shaped Glasses (When the Heart Guides the Hand)" and appeared in the song's music video. They became engaged in January 2010, but ended their relationship seven months later.

In 2011, Wood publicly disclosed that she is bisexual, and rekindled her relationship with Jamie Bell. They were married in October 2012 and had a son in July 2013. In May 2014, they announced their separation. By 2015, Wood was in a relationship with her bandmate Zach Villa. They were engaged in January 2017 but called it off that September. As of December 2021, Wood and Bell are in dispute over the custody of their son. Bell said he was deprived of contact with him when Wood moved from Los Angeles to Nashville; Wood claimed she did this to protect the child from former fiancé Marilyn Manson. Bell argued in court that Wood's "story defies credibility", and accused her of "withholding our son from me for other reasons of her own invention."

In 2020, Wood wrote a message on Twitter regarding the death of Kobe Bryant, describing Bryant as a "rapist", a reference to his 2003 sexual assault case. Many, including Bryant's widow, criticized Wood for the comment, and Wood deleted her Twitter account soon after.

Marilyn Manson abuse allegations

In 2016, Wood told a Rolling Stone reporter she had been raped twice years ago, once by a "significant other". In February 2021, Wood named Manson as her alleged abuser on Instagram, where four other women made similar allegations against him. 16 people have made accusations against Manson, and four have sued him for sexual assault. The Los Angeles County Sheriff's Department said they were investigating Manson due to allegations of domestic violence. In September 2022, the LACSD presented the report of their 19-month investigation on Manson to California district attorney George Gascón. Gascón called the file "partial", and said more evidence was needed in order to file charges.

In March 2022, HBO released the docuseries Phoenix Rising, focusing on these allegations and the circumstances that led Wood, who was 18 at the time, to enter a relationship with the then-37-year-old Manson. That month, Manson filed a lawsuit against Wood for defamation, intentional infliction of emotional distress, violations of the California Comprehensive Computer Data Access and Fraud Act, as well as the impersonation of an FBI agent and falsifying federal documents.

Filmography

Film

Television

Music video

References

External links

 
 

1987 births
20th-century American actresses
21st-century American actresses
Actors from Raleigh, North Carolina
Actresses from North Carolina
American child actresses
American film actresses
American soap opera actresses
American television actresses
American voice actresses
Bisexual actresses
Bisexual musicians
Jewish American actresses
Jewish American musicians
Bisexual Jews
LGBT people from North Carolina
Living people
Musicians from Raleigh, North Carolina
American bisexual actors
American female taekwondo practitioners